Thomas Attwood was a 15th-century priest and academic.

Attwood was Master of Gonville Hall from 1426 to 1454. He held livings at Lolworth, Boxworth, Elsworth, Lopham and Mutford. He was also Chaplain to John Mowbray, 3rd Duke of Norfolk.

References 

Alumni of Gonville Hall, Cambridge
Fellows of Gonville Hall, Cambridge
Masters of Gonville Hall, Cambridge
15th-century English people
1454 deaths